Eileen Moore (born August 1932 in London, England) is a British actress. She is best known as Sheila in the film An Inspector Calls.

Life
Moore was born in London in August 1932. She was married to actor George Cole from 1954 until their divorce in 1962. They had two children. She met Cole on the set of An Inspector Calls. In 1968 she married Michael Anthony Owens.

Her children include the writer and producer Crispin Cole and daughter Harriet Cole.

Films
Mr. Denning Drives North (1951) as Liz Denning
The Happy Family (1952) as Joan
The Girl on the Pier (1953) as Cathy Chubb
Thought to Kill (1953)
The Good Beginning (1953) as Kit Lipson
The Men of Sherwood Forest (1954) as Lady Alys
An Inspector Calls (1954) as Sheila Birling (where she met George Cole)
The Green Man (1956) as Joan Moore (with George Cole as the star)
A Town Like Alice (1956) as Mrs Holland
Devil's Bait (1959) as Barbara
Cry Wolf (1969) as Muriel Walker (for the Children's Film Foundation)

TV
Dixon of Dock Green (1955)
Colonel March of Scotland Yard (1956)
Danger Man (1960)
The Third Man (TV series) (1960)
Dr Finlay's Casebook (1962)
Champion House (1967)
Les Miserables  (series) 1967–8
Catweazle (series) 1970

References

1932 births
Living people
People from London
British film actresses
British television actresses
20th-century British actresses